Ashok Hall Girls' Higher Secondary School is a school located at Sarat Bose Road, Kolkata, West Bengal India. This is a girls' school and is affiliated to the CBSE..

History
The school was established in 1951.

See also
Education in India
List of schools in India
Education in West Bengal

References

External links 
 

Primary schools in West Bengal
High schools and secondary schools in West Bengal
Girls' schools in Kolkata
Educational institutions established in 1951
1951 establishments in West Bengal